Woo Ki-hoon (born 1996) is a South Korean actor and model. He is best known for his drama roles in Solomon's Perjury, Second 20s and The Missing.

Filmography

Television series

Film

References

External links 
 
 

1996 births
Living people
21st-century South Korean male actors
South Korean male models
South Korean male television actors
South Korean male film actors